"Koi Kogarete" is the third single from Beni under the label Universal Japan. The song is described as the ultimate romantic love song for the summer. The song is a med-tempo that will make sure to those with one sided loves cry, a real signature song.

Although the single didn't chart in the weekly top 50 of the Oricon charts, it did quite well on the Recochoku chart debuting on the #3 place.

Track listing 
 Koi Kogarete (恋焦がれて; Yearning for Love) 
 Cruise the World
 Forever 21
 恋焦がれて（Instrumental）

Charts

References

2009 singles
Beni (singer) songs
2009 songs